Internationalist Communist League was a Trotskyist political party in Portugal. LCI was founded in 1973. It became the Portuguese section of the reunified Fourth International.

LCI published Acção Comunista, and, for young people, "Toupeira Vermelha".

In 1978 LCI merged with PRT to form the Revolutionary Socialist Party.

Trotskyist organisations in Portugal
Fourth International (post-reunification)
Defunct communist parties in Portugal
Political parties established in 1973
Political parties disestablished in 1978
1973 establishments in Portugal
1978 disestablishments in Portugal